Claude Lewis  (27 July 1908 – 27 April 1993) was an English cricketer. He played 128 first-class matches for Kent between 1933 and 1953. Lewis was awarded the British Empire Medal in the 1989 New Year Honours for services to cricket.

References

External links
 

1908 births
1993 deaths
English cricketers
Kent cricketers
People from Sittingbourne
Sportspeople from Kent